Agostino Castellacci (born 1670) was an Italian painter of the Baroque period.

Biography
He was born in Ascoli Piceno, and was initially a pupil of Antonio Cecchini, then he joined, along with fellow pupil Francesco Mancini, the studio of Carlo Cignani. He painted a San Biagio for the church of San Giacomo in Pesaro.

References

1670 births
Year of death unknown
17th-century Italian painters
Italian male painters
Painters from Bologna
Italian Baroque painters